Obrež is a village in Serbia. It is situated in the Pećinci municipality, in the Srem District, Vojvodina province.  The village has a Serb ethnic majority and its population numbering 1,400 people (2002 census). In 2006, construction began on a new village center building in which a main administrative office, and a small night club/bar were built. The two venues frequently host Serbian folk singers.

See also
List of places in Serbia
List of cities, towns and villages in Vojvodina

Populated places in Syrmia
Populated places in Srem District
Pećinci